The Attic Entertainment Software GmbH was a German video game developer and publisher that was founded in September 1990 by Hans-Jürgen Brändle, Jochen Hamma and Guido Henkel in Albstadt, Baden-Württemberg. Attic has been inactive since 2001. The founder, Hans-Jürgen Brändle, was reported to have died in Las Vegas during the month of August, 2005.

Attic's breakthrough was the so-called Northlands Trilogy (Realms of Arkania: Blade of Destiny, Realms of Arkania: Star Trail and Realms of Arkania: Shadows over Riva), a series of role-playing video games based upon the popular German tabletop role-playing game The Dark Eye.

List of games

1990 - Lords of Doom (Amiga, Atari ST, C64, MS-DOS)
1991 - The Oath (Amiga)
1991 - Spirit of Adventure (Amiga, Atari ST, C64, MS-DOS)
1991 - Drachen von Laas (Amiga, MS-DOS)
1993 - Realms of Arkania: Blade of Destiny (Amiga, MS-DOS)
1994 - Realms of Arkania: Star Trail (MS-DOS)
1995 - Fears (Amiga) publisher only
1995 - Druid: Daemons of the Mind  (MS-DOS) German: Der Druidenzirkel: Im Netz der Träume
1997 - Herrscher der Meere (MS-DOS)
1997 - Realms of Arkania: Shadows over Riva (MS-DOS)

Unreleased
The Lady, the Mage and the Knight (with Larian Studios)

References

Video game development companies
Video game companies established in 1990
Video game companies disestablished in 2001
Defunct video game companies of Germany
Companies based in Baden-Württemberg
German companies established in 1990
German companies disestablished in 2001